Body language is a form of communication.

Body language may also refer to:

Music
 Body Language (band), an American electronic/alternative music group

Albums
 Body Language (Boney James album), 1999
 Body Language (Jonathan Cain album), 1997
 Body Language (Kylie Minogue album), 2003
Body Language (Blake Shelton album), 2021.

Songs
 "Body Language" (Kid Ink song), 2014
 "Body Language" (Queen song), 1982
 "Body Language" (Jesse McCartney song), 2009
 "Body Language" (Heidi Montag song)
 "Body Language", a 1980 song by The Dooleys
 "Body Language", a 2004 song by and M.A.N.D.Y and Booka Shade
 "Body Language", a 2016 song by Carly Rae Jepsen from Emotion: Side B
 "Body Language", a 2018 song by Doja Cat from Amala
 "Body Language (Intro)", a 2018 song by Kali Uchis from Isolation

Television and Film
 Body Language (1992 film), a thriller film with Heather Locklear
 Body Language (1995 film), a film with Tom Berenger
 Body Language (2011 film), a Dutch dance film
 Body Language (2017 film), a Nigerian thriller
 Body Language (game show), a 1984 game show hosted by Tom Kennedy
 "Body Language" (The Office), a 2010 episode of The Office (U.S. TV series)

Literature
 Body Language (book) by Allan Pease
 Body Language, a book by Julius Fast
 Body Language (play), a 1990 play by Alan Ayckbourn